Gian Paolo Callegari (1909-1982) was an Italian screenwriter and film director.  He worked on several American films shot in Italy. This included Roberto Rossellini's 1950 film Stromboli.

Selected filmography
 The Thrill of the Skies (1940)
 Honeymoon (1941)
 Il fanciullo del West (1943)
 Dagli Appennini alle Ande (1943)
 Resurrection (1944)
 Macario Against Zagomar (1944)
 Ring Around the Clock (1950)
 The Fighting Men (1950)
 Stromboli (1950)
 They Were Three Hundred (1952)
The Treasure of Bengal (1953)
 The Warrior and the Slave Girl (1958)
 Head of a Tyrant (1959)
 Minotaur, the Wild Beast of Crete (1960)
 Gladiator of Rome (1962)
 The 300 Spartans (1962)
 Pontius Pilate (film) (1962)
 Goliath and the Rebel Slave (1963)
 The Beast of Babylon Against the Son of Hercules (1963)
 The Avenger of Venice (1964)
 Revolt of the Praetorians (1964)
 Messalina vs. the Son of Hercules (1964)
 Password: Kill Agent Gordon (1966)
 The Long, the Short, the Cat (1967)
 Come rubammo la bomba atomica (1967)

References

Bibliography
 Roy Kinnard & Tony Crnkovich. Italian Sword and Sandal Films, 1908–1990. McFarland, 2017.
 Santas, Constantine & Wilson, James M. The Essential Films of Ingrid Bergman. Rowman & Littlefield, 2018.

External links

1909 births
1982 deaths
Italian film directors
Italian screenwriters
People from Bologna

it:Gian Paolo Callegari